Cheung Chau Bun Festival or Cheung Chau Da Jiu Festival is a traditional Chinese festival on the island of Cheung Chau in Hong Kong. Held annually, and with therefore the most public exposure, it is by far the most famous of such Da Jiu festivals, with Jiu being a Taoist sacrificial ceremony.
Such events are held by mostly rural communities in Hong Kong, either annually or at a set interval of years ranging all the way up to once every 60 years (i.e. the same year in the Chinese astrological calendar).  Other places that may share the folk custom include Taiwan, Sichuan, Fujian and Guangdong.

Overview 

Cheung Chau's Bun Festival, which draws tens of thousands of local and overseas tourists every year, is staged to mark the Eighth day of the Fourth Month, in the Chinese calendar (this is usually in early May). It coincides with the local celebration of Buddha's Birthday.

The Cheung Chau Bun Festival began as a fun and exciting ritual for fishing communities to pray for safety from pirates. Today this religious origin has largely been forgotten, and the festival has mainly become a showcase of traditional Chinese culture.

Kwok Kam Kee, the official bun supplier for the festival which was opened 40 years ago, makes over 60,000 buns for the festival.

History 
One story of the origin of the festival is that in the 18th century, the island of Cheung Chau was devastated by a plague and infiltrated by pirates until local fishermen brought an image of their patron Deity, Pak Tai to the island. Paraded through the village lanes, the deity drove away evil spirits. Villagers also disguised themselves as various other deities and walked around the island to drive away the evil spirits.
Hailufeng people are the first on Cheung Chau to worship Pak Tai. The Cantonese and Tanka on the island subsequently also worship Pak Tai. Gradually, all dialect groups on the island took part in the Cheung Chau Bun Festival which integrates different folk elements.

Activities

Vegetarian

Every year on the 8th day of the fourth month of the lunar calendar, the islanders organise a weeklong thanksgiving, the Cheung Chau Bun Festival usually in April or May. The festival lasts for seven days. On three of these days the entire island goes vegetarian; most of the island's famous seafood restaurants adhere to this tradition. The local McDonald's also takes meat off the menu and instead sells veggie burgers made of mushrooms.

Parade of floats / Floating Colours
In addition to traditional lion dances and dragon dances, children dressed as legendary and modern heroes are suspended above the crowd on the tips of swords and paper fans. They form the parade-in-the-air and are all secured within steel frames, though they appear to glide through the air. Parents consider it a great honour for their offspring to be part of the parade.

This fascinating procession is accompanied by the bedlam of musicians loudly beating gongs and drums to ward off evil spirits. It is led by a spectacular image of Pak Tai, the God of Water and Lord of the North, to whom the island's Temple of the Jade Vacuity is dedicated.

Deities
Here are some of the important Deities worshipped by Cheung Chau people during the festive celebration:

Pak Tai
Since Cheung Chau is traditionally an island of fisherfolk, Pak Tai is its most revered divinity, since it is believed he has the power to confer smooth sailing for the fishing boats as well as providing good catches for their crews. Pious believers recognise him as "Pei Fang Chen Wu Hsuan T'ien Shang Ti" (True Soldier and Superior Divinity of the Deep Heaven of the North).

Tin Hau (Tian Shang Sheng Mu) 
The second of the most significant deities involved in the celebration is the highly-revered Tin Hau, Goddess of the Seas and protector of all fishermen and boat people. Celebrated for providing warnings of imminent storms and saving countless lives from wreckage, she is a popular motherly goddess in Southern China region and won the devotion of many fisherfolk.

Kuan Yin and Hung Hsing
Two more deities complete the celestial divinities taking part in the parade: Kuan Yin, the Goddess of Mercy with her tranquil and ever compassionate smile; and Hung Shing, the terrifying God of the South with his menacing head-dress, unkind face, bushy black beard.

Bun snatching 

The centrepiece of the festival is at Pak Tai Temple where the "Bun Towers" (包山) stand. These are three giant 60-feet bamboo towers covered with buns. It is these bun-covered towers that give the festival its name. It originates from the custom in Southern Fujian and Chaozhou known as qianggu, where people snatch food that has been offered to the lonely spirits. Historically, young men would race up the tower to get hold of the buns; the higher the bun, the better fortune it was supposed to bring to the holder's family; the race was known as "Bun-snatching". However, during a race in 1978 one of the towers collapsed, injuring more than 100 people. In subsequent years, three designated climbers (one climber to each tower) raced up their respective towers and having cleared the top buns proceeded to strip the towers of their buns as they descended.

The three "Bun Mountains" are still placed in the area in front of Pak Tai Temple, and are constructed using the traditional fixation method — bamboo scaffolding.

In 2005, a single tower climbing event in the adjacent sports ground was revived as a race—with extra safety precautions including proper mountain-climbing tools as well as tutorials for participants (which now include women). A teamwork version of the event was added in 2006. The revised version of "Bun-snatching" as well as the traditional three "Bun Mountains" still have their buns removed from the towers at midnight of the Festival. 

In February 2007, it was further announced that the buns on the single-tower construct will henceforth be made of plastic.  During the festival, Chinese operas, lion dances, and religious services also take place on the island.

Kwok Ka-Ming

Kwok Ka-Ming, born in Cheung Chau, is a physical trainer and 4 times winner of the Cheung Chau bun-scrambling competition in Cheung Chau, Hong Kong. The Bun Scrambling Event has been a traditional activity of the Cheung Chau Bun Festival. Kwok is a resident of Cheung Chau Island and works as a physical trainer for Shatin firefighters.

In 2005, in the first year of the modern competition, the trophy eventually went to Mr Kwok Ka-ming, who led a narrow edge of 30 marks over the first runner-up, Mr Yau Hung-ming, who scored 423 marks. In 2006, after an exciting round of the competition, Kwok Ka-ming retains the trophy by scoring 705 marks.

In 2007, Kwok Ka-Ming won by scoring 648 marks. Kwok Ka-Ming lost his title in 2008, when he scored 715 marks. In 2009, Kwok Ka-Ming did not feature in the top 3. But Kwok was the bun-scrambling king again in 2010, when he won the game by scoring 939 points. In 2011 he failed to make it to the finals.

Burning of paper effigies
At a quarter to midnight a paper effigy of the King of the Ghosts is set ablaze, enormous incense sticks are lit and the buns are harvested and distributed to the villagers, who, pleased to be sharing in this propitious good fortune, rejoice late into the night.

Return of bun-snatching
 As mentioned above, the bun-snatching ritual was abandoned by government decree due to the 1978 collapse of a tower. Still, many Cheung Chau villagers regard this celebration as part and parcel of their life, and  also as an example of the precious culture of Hong Kong. In addition to the villagers' immense urge to resume the ritual, a local cartoon movie My Life as McDull recalled the abandoned ceremony, giving rise to nostalgia in its viewers. Because of its great popularity, the long-awaited ritual was reintroduced on 15 May 2005. Safety measures were intensified: only 12 well-trained athletes selected from preliminary competitions were permitted to climb on one single "Bun Mountain", and instead of bamboo, the framework of the "Bun Mountains" was made of steel.

More about My Life as McDull and bun-snatching
In a part of the film, McDull decides to train to be an Olympic-level athlete like the Hong Kong Olympian Lee Lai-shan. However, the trade he learns is Cheung Chau bun-snatching. Realising that bun-snatching is not a formal sporting event in the Olympic games, McDull's mother writes a letter to the chairman of the International Olympic Committee (IOC), asking him/her with her limited proficiency of English to sanctify the so-called sport event.

See also
List of Buddhist festivals 
Culture of Hong Kong
Chinese folk religion
Taai Ping Ching Jiu (太平清醮)
Taoism in Hong Kong
Yuk Hui Temple, Pak She Street, Tung Wan

References

Further reading

External links 

 Cheung Chau Bun Festival at discoverhongkong.com
 Photographs of Cheung Chau Bun Festival 2008

Cheung Chau
Festivals in Hong Kong
Buddhist holidays
Buddhist festivals
May observances
Observances set by the Chinese calendar